Helen Clark (born 1950) is a former Prime Minister of New Zealand.

Helen Clark is also the name of:
Helen Bright Clark (1840–1927), British feminist
Helen Taggart Clark (1849–?), American journalist and poet
Helen Clark (singer) (fl. 1910s–1920s), singer of "I'm Forever Blowing Bubbles"
Helen Clark (oral historian) (born 1952), oral history pioneer in Scotland
Helen Clark (British politician) (born 1954), Labour Member of Parliament for Peterborough
Helen Elizabeth Shearburn Clark, expert on echinoderms

See also 
Helen Clarke (disambiguation)